Amityville: Evil Never Dies (also known as Amityville Clownhouse) is a 2017 American horror film written and directed by Dustin Ferguson. It was released direct-to-video, and is the nineteenth film to be inspired by Jay Anson's 1977 novel The Amityville Horror. A sequel to the 2016 film The Amityville Legacy, it continues the story of an evil cymbal banging monkey toy that was taken from 112 Ocean Avenue, a haunted house in Amityville, New York.

Plot 

After acquiring a clown painting that is implied to have originated from 112 Ocean Avenue in Amityville, New York, a Rhode Island senator named Ty Pangborn dons clown makeup and uses a shotgun to kill his dysfunctional family during his son's birthday party, afterward committing suicide while forlornly stating, "This isn't funny." A week later, a trio of thieves led by Drake break into the Pangborn residence in search of the clown painting, and are murdered by a spectral clown, which rips out and eats Drake's heart. A priest is then shown being interviewed about 112 Ocean Avenue. The priest explains that even though the house was at some point destroyed, its evil still lives on in the form of objects (including a lamp, a clock, a mirror, a dollhouse, and a cymbal banging monkey toy) that were scavenged from it and sold to oblivious buyers all over the United States.

In Nebraska, Ben and his wife Michelle purchase the toy monkey from an antique shop called Jesse's Junk Drawer. The monkey causes Ben and Michelle to begin having nightmares about demons and 112 Ocean Avenue while it uses its supernatural powers to terrorize Michelle and corrupt Ben, who it influences into beating and raping a prostitute and Michelle. The monkey afterward alters Ben's memories so that he no longer remembers his crimes, also altering his perception of reality so that he can no longer even see the wounds that has he inflicted upon Michelle. Michelle throws the monkey away, but it returns to her, so she calls Jesse's Junk Drawer to inquire about it, and is told by the antique dealer that the monkey was acquired from the estate of Mark Janson, a man who slaughtered almost his entire family during a reunion in Lincoln. Michelle researches the Janson family massacre and visits its sole survivor, Mark's institutionalized daughter, Julia. Michelle learns about the familicide committed by Ronald DeFeo Jr. in 112 Ocean Avenue, about the "cursed objects" taken from the house that have instigated "copycat crimes" all over America, and about "a theatre full of people that's possessed."

When Michelle returns home, she is attacked by a shotgun-wielding Ben, who declares that she is to be sacrificed to Beelzebub. Michelle shoots the monkey with Ben's shotgun, and afterward flees the house with a recovered Ben. The antique dealer is then shown collecting the destroyed monkey, which he reassembles and puts back up for sale in Jesse's Junk Drawer.

Cast

Reception 

While Charlie Cargile of PopHorror criticized several aspects of the film like its pacing and abrupt ending, he still noted that, despite its technical issues and lack of budget, it was still "a solid film" with enjoyable "micro budget charm."

References

External links 

 
 
 Interview with Dustin Ferguson at (re)Search my Trash

2017 direct-to-video films
2017 films
2017 horror films
2017 independent films
2010s exploitation films
2010s ghost films
2010s psychological horror films
2010s supernatural horror films
Adultery in films
American direct-to-video films
American exploitation films
American ghost films
American independent films
American psychological horror films
American sequel films
American supernatural horror films
Amityville Horror films
Crimes against sex workers in fiction
Demons in film
Direct-to-video horror films
Direct-to-video sequel films
Fiction about familicide
Films about altered memories
Films about birthdays
Films about cannibalism
Films about domestic violence
Films about dysfunctional families
Films about human sacrifice
Films about mass murder
Films about nightmares
Films about prostitution in the United States
Films about rape
Films about sentient toys
Films set in 2017
Films set in Nebraska
Films set in psychiatric hospitals
Films set in Rhode Island
Films shot in Nebraska
Horror films about clowns
Horror films about toys
Murder–suicide in films
Sentient objects in fiction
Unofficial sequel films
2010s English-language films
2010s American films